Amaradia may refer to the following rivers in Romania:

Amaradia (Dolj), a tributary of the Jiu in Dolj County and Gorj County 
Amaradia (Gorj), a tributary of the Jiu in Gorj County